Galactic Worm 123.4-1.5 (GW 123.4-1.5) is an H I region with a mass of approximately 105 MSun. It has an unusual mushroom-shaped structure that may be the result of having been formed by an infalling cloud slamming through the disc of the Milky Way from the other side. The high-velocity cloud in question is theorized as having hit at around 100 km/s, 5 years ago.

References

H I regions
Cassiopeia (constellation)